This is a list of South African television related events from 2012.

Events
11 September - The Wild actress Zakeeya Patel and her partner Ryan Hammond win the sixth season of Strictly Come Dancing.
17 October - 16-year-old singer Johnny Apple wins the fourth season of SA's Got Talent.
26 November - Musa Sekwene wins the ninth season of Idols South Africa.

Debuts

Domestic
2 March - Isibaya (Mzansi Magic) (2013–present)
10 April - Million Rand Money Drop (2013)
10 July - Strictly Come Dancing (SABC2) (2006-2008, 2013–2015)

International
3 August - /// Henry Hugglemonster (Disney Junior)
/ Tilly and Friends (CBeebies)

Television shows

1980s
Good Morning South Africa (1985–present)
Carte Blanche (1988–present)

1990s
Top Billing (1992–present)
Generations (1994–present)
Isidingo (1998–present)

2000s
Idols South Africa (2002–present)
Rhythm City (2007–present)
SA's Got Talent (2009–present)

New channels
3 July - MTV

Ending this year

Births

Deaths
Nelson Rolihlahla Mandela (1st Black President of South Africa)

See also
2013 in South Africa